Haze is an atmospheric phenomenon.

Haze may refer to:

 Haze machine, device used in the entertainment industry to simulate the atmospheric phenomenon
 Turbidity, the cloudiness of a fluid or transparent solids, such as glass or plastic, as measured by the percentage of light that is deflected or attenuated
 Haze (optics), the scattering of light out of the regular direction during reflection or transmission
 Corneal opacification, central corneal opacification is a diagnostic "danger sign" in red eye (medicine)
 Hazing, a practice of harassment and initiation
 Hazing, to use voice, body and hand movements to scare away a wild animal

Haze may also refer to:

In film
 Haze (2005 film), a 2005 Japanese thriller film written and directed by Shinya Tsukamoto
 Haze (2010 film), a 2010 Turkish film

In gaming
 Haze (video game), PlayStation 3 video game developed by Free Radical Design

In music
 Haze (band), progressive rock band
 "Haze" (song), song by nu-metal band Korn for the video game, Haze
 ”Haze” song by 5 Seconds Of Summer from 5SOS5

In literature
 Dolores Haze, the character after whose nickname Vladimir Nabokov's novel Lolita is named

People

Surname
 Eric Haze, graffiti artist and designer
 Jenna Haze, American pornographic actress
 Jonathan Haze, American actor
John Haze, also known as Doktor Haze, English circus owner and performer

Stage names
 Angel Haze, stage name of Raykeea Wilson, an American rapper
 Haze, stage name of Malaysian singer Harikrish Menon

Other
 Haze (cannabis), an identifying name for a strain and a varieties of cannabis strains
 Haze, the NATO reporting name for the Soviet Mil Mi-14 military helicopter

See also
Purple Haze (disambiguation)